Castelnuovo di Ceva is a comune (municipality) in the Province of Cuneo in the Italian region Piedmont, located about  southeast of Turin and about  east of Cuneo.

Castelnuovo di Ceva borders the following municipalities: Montezemolo, Murialdo, Priero, and Roccavignale.

References

Cities and towns in Piedmont
Comunità Montana Valli Mongia, Cevetta e Langa Cebana